Kamil Bortniczuk (born 11 June 1983 in Głuchołazy, Poland) is a Polish politician, member of the VIII and IX Sejm as a member of the Agreement political party, within the Law and Justice parliamentary club as part of the United Right coalition. He represents the Opole constituency. In October 2021 he became the Polish Minister of Sport and Tourism.

Polish Minister of Sport and Tourism
On 26 October 2021 he became the Polish Minister of Sport and Tourism.

In April 2022, after the 2022 Russian invasion of Ukraine, he said that Poland wanted Russia to be excluded from every sports federation led by the International Olympic Committee until peace has been restored in Ukraine, and Ukraine  has received compensation for the invasion.

Personal and early years
In 2007 he finished studies in international relations in the University of Wrocław, and in 2017 in law in the University of Gdańsk.

He is married to Anna, and has three daughters, Milena, Łucja and Sara as well as a son, Julian.

References 

1983 births
Living people
Members of the Polish Sejm 2019–2023
Members of the Polish Sejm 2015–2019
21st-century Polish politicians